Bruneian may refer to:
 Something of, or related to Brunei
 A person from Brunei, or of Bruneian descent. For information about the Bruneian people, see Demographics of Brunei and Culture of Brunei. For specific Bruneians, see List of Bruneians.
 There is no language called "Bruneian".  See Languages of Brunei.

See also 
 

Language and nationality disambiguation pages